Banni Mata Temple, also known variously as the Mahakali Banni Mata Temple, is located in Chamba District, a hill station in the State of Himachal Pradesh in north India. This temple is situated at a height of 8,500 feet, right at the base of Pir Panjal Range in the Chamba Valley.
It is an ancient temple dedicated to Devi Kali, a goddess figure in Hinduism. The temple is surrounded by deep forests at the foot of the Himālayas.
It is noted as Shakti Devi Temple too. It is near to Tundah village and just opposite to Manimahesh Peak. This temple is named as Banni because this place has a lot of Ban trees or Oak trees.

History 

The legend behind Banni Mata dates farther back to the Mahabharata. Right up to the Panadavas and Mahabharata. It is said that all the 5 Pandava brothers, having ruled their kingdom departed for the Himalayas. While roaming in the Himalayas in search of Swarg (the Hindu heaven), they reached somewhere near the Pir Panjal range. Spring was setting in and they decided it was time to go a little higher and start farming for food. So, they headed towards Charola (near Kali Chho Pass). While on their way up, they encountered multiple obstacles. The mountains were difficult to walk on, snow was all over. There were treacherous slopes and crevices. Suddenly, it started snowing. One after another, four of the Pandavas and Draupadi succumbed to the weather and terrain. As each one started dying, the others found a reason for his/her death in his karma during that incarnation. All but Yudhishthira, who was known for his righteousness, didn't die on the way. Yudhishthira reached Swarg.

When four of the brothers and Draupadi had died and Yudhishthira had reached Swarg, Draupadi, whose mortal flesh is believed to have been inhabited by Goddess Kali at times, appeared in the incarnation of goddess Kali. It is believed a huge rock in high Pir Panjals at Charola split vertically to reveal three Trishuls, which can still be seen there. After this, the goddess found her next home at Lyundi, at the base of the Pir Panjals and finally settled in the village of Banni. Since then, there has been a temple dedicated to Banni Mata (an incarnation of Kali) at this village.

Importance 

The temple and the goddess are both very important in the Bharmour region. Shepherds crossing Kali Chho pass to Lahaul (Kali is for Goddess Kali and Chho is waterfall, the pass has a waterfall close to it) visit the temple to seek the goddesses blessings for a safe crossing and have done so for ages now. Pilgrims from all over the Bharmour region and other parts of Himachal find their way to the temple to pay obeisance to the goddess. It is believed Goddess Kali grants all wishes and gives children to couples who don't have anyone, making the journey with total devotion and fervor. Sometime around August, in the Bhadrapad month of the Hindu calendar, a fair is organized at the temple and it attracts devotees from all around. The fair, in typical Kali Puja style involves severing the heads of many goats. As soon as a goat's head is severed, the temple Shaman, called Chela in local language and bestowed with special powers by the goddess drinks the blood of the severed goat. It is said he can drink blood from as many goats as are severed at a time and that this ability is a reflection of his being in direct communion with the goddess. Liquor is another common offering and the Chela takes a gulp from each bottle offered.

In recent times, the pilgrimage to Banni Mata has become much easier with a road approaching Tundah, which leaves only 4 km to walk. With another road proposed to connect Banni, the trek will soon be over. However, the pilgrimage further up to Lyundi and Charola will continue to attract pilgrims by thousands.

References

External links
 Trek Himachal - Banni Mata Temple https://web.archive.org/web/20150527103011/http://www.trekhimachal.com/newsite/legends/banni-mata
 HP Tour and Travel - Banni Mata Temple http://www.hptourtravel.com/location/banni-mata-temple/

Hindu temples in Himachal Pradesh
Buildings and structures in Chamba district